Casillas may refer to:
Casillas, Guatemala, a municipality in the department of Santa Rosa, Guatemala
Casillas, Ávila, a municipality located in the province of Ávila, Castile and León, Spain
Casillas de Coria, a municipality located in the province of Cáceres, Extremadura, Spain
Casillas de Flores, a municipality located in the province of Salamanca, Castile and León, Spain
Casillas de Camineros, structures built every 6 kilometers alongside major roads in Puerto Rico
Casillas (surname)